Acraea aubyni, the Aubyn Rogers' acraea, is a butterfly in the family Nymphalidae. It is found along the coast of Kenya and possibly north-eastern Tanzania.

Description

A. aubyni Eltr. (60a). Basal part of the forewing above reddish; the red colour covers the cell to its apex, cellules 1 a to 2 almost to the distal margin and the base of cellule 3; the apical part is blackish with three short whitish transparent spots in 4 to 6. Hindwing above light red nearly to the base with free black dots and a sharply defined black marginal band 2 mm. in breadth; beneath light ochre-yellowish, at the distal margin with short, fine streaks on the folds, which do not quite reach the margin. British East Africa.

Biology
The habitat consists of coastal forests.

Taxonomy
It is a member of the Acraea masamba species group - but see also Pierre & Bernaud, 2014

References

External links

Images representing  Acraea aubyni at Bold

Butterflies described in 1912
aubyni